Cyperus jeminicus is a species of sedge that is native to parts of Africa, the Middle East and India.

The species was first formally described by the botanist Christen Friis Rottbøll in 1773.

See also 
 List of Cyperus species

References 

jeminicus
Taxa named by Christen Friis Rottbøll
Plants described in 1773
Flora of Burkina Faso
Flora of Cape Verde
Flora of Chad
Flora of Djibouti
Flora of Egypt
Flora of Eritrea
Flora of India
Flora of Madagascar
Flora of Mali
Flora of Niger
Flora of Mauritania
Flora of Oman
Flora of Saudi Arabia
Flora of Senegal
Flora of Somalia
Flora of Sudan
Flora of Tunisia
Flora of Yemen